Yana Yulievna Zavatskaya  (born 11 March 1970 in Leningrad) is a Soviet Russian prose writer and translator. Laureate of the 2019 "Running on Waves" Prize.
Yana Zavatskaya is a social fiction writer.
She also is a blogger (at LiveJournal, listed in the Top 100 bloggers). She writes for the Pravda.ru.

Her father was a mathematics teacher and poet.
She grew up in Chelyabinsk. 
She completed four years of medical school.

In 1993, she moved with her family to Germany. In Germany, she works in a nursing home for elderly. 

She is Catholic, and a member of the German Communist Party. 

She has two children.

She was criticized by Alexander Tarasov.

Publications
Zavatskaya is the author of five books. Her first book was published by Eksmo. Her first novel is written in the genre of dystopia.

References

Sources
 Mitrofanova, A. V. "Religio-Political Utopia by Iana Zavatskaia". In: The Post-Soviet Politics of Utopia: Language, Fiction and Fantasy in Modern Russia. Ed.by Mikhail Suslov and Per-Arne Bodin. London: I. B. Tauris, 2020. pp. 155—174.

1970 births
Living people
Russian bloggers
Russian women bloggers
21st-century Russian women writers
Russian Marxists
Women Marxists
Russian feminists
21st-century Russian writers